Sir Lawrence Vaughan Palk, 3rd Baronet (24 April 1793 – 16 May 1860) of Haldon House in the parish of Kenn, near Exeter in Devon, was a landowner and Member of Parliament for Ashburton, Devon, from 1818 to 1831.

Origins
He was born on 25 April 1793 the son of Sir Lawrence Palk, 2nd Baronet (c. 1766–1813) by his wife Dorothy, daughter of Wilmot Vaughan, 1st Earl of Lisburne.

Haldon House
Haldon House was purchased by Sir Robert Palk, 1st Baronet (1717–1798) and was one of the "best" houses in Devon, built in the style of Buckingham House in London.

Death and succession
He died at Haldon House on 16 May 1860 and was succeeded by his son Lawrence Palk, 1st Baron Haldon (1818–1883).

References

1793 births
1860 deaths
Baronets in the Baronetage of Great Britain
People educated at Eton College
Alumni of Christ Church, Oxford
UK MPs 1818–1820
UK MPs 1820–1826
UK MPs 1826–1830
UK MPs 1830–1831
Members of the Parliament of the United Kingdom for Ashburton
Politicians from Exeter